The 1998 Queen's Birthday Honours in New Zealand, celebrating the official birthday of Queen Elizabeth II, were appointments made by the Queen in her right as Queen of New Zealand, on the advice of the New Zealand government, to various orders and honours to reward and highlight good works by New Zealanders. They were announced on 1 June 1998.

The recipients of honours are displayed here as they were styled before their new honour.

New Zealand Order of Merit

Dame Companion (DNZM)
 Susan Elizabeth Anne Devoy  – of Auckland. For services to sport and the community. 
 Elizabeth Ann Hanan – of Dunedin. For services to the community.

Knight Companion (KNZM)
 Rajeshwar (Roger) Sarup Bhatnagar – of Auckland. For services to business and the community. 
 The Right Honourable Ian Lloyd McKay – of Wellington. For services as a judge of the Court of Appeal and to the law. 
 Wilson James Whineray  – of Auckland. For services to sport and business management.

Companion (CNZM)
 Jennifer Barbara Gibbs – of Auckland. For services to art. 
 Judith Leicester, Lady Hay  – of Christchurch. For services to the community. 
 Air Vice-Marshal David William Hill  – Royal New Zealand Air Force.
 Alan Raymond Johnston   – of Lower Hutt. For services to the New Zealand Returned Services Association. 
 Judith Anne Kilpatrick – of Auckland. For services to nursing education. 
 Dr Kāterina Te Heikōkō Mataira – of Raglan. For services to the Māori language. 
 Dr Judith Olwyn Medlicott – of Dunedin. For services to the legal profession, education and the community. 
 Leonard Wallace David Munn – of Whangārei. For services to returned services personnel. 
 Frank Ivan Joseph Nobilo – of London, United Kingdom. For services to golf. 
 Noel Frank Pope  – of Tauranga. For services to local government. 
 Professor Emeritus Alexander Lindsay Rae  – of Palmerston North. For services to animal genetics. 
 Gordon Keith Stephenson – of Putāruru. For services to conservation. 
 Anna (Ans) Jacoba Westra – of Lower Hutt. For services to photography.

Officer (ONZM)
 Dr Michael Ernest John Beard – of Christchurch. For services to medicine. 
 Associate Professor Samir Nessim Bishara – of Dunedin. For services to neurosurgery. 
 William Wharekaihua "Willie" Coates – of Kawerau. For services to the community. 
 Dr Felix Cornelius Donnelly – of Auckland. For services to the welfare of youth. 
 Rona Mary Halsall – of Westport. For services to music and the community. 
 John Edward Hawke – of Auckland. For services to dentistry and the community. 
 Ian Neil Holyoake – of Wellington; Assistant Commissioner, New Zealand Police. 
 Stanley Jackson –of Auckland. For services to music. 
 Andrew Ivan Robert Jamieson  – of Cust. For services to business management and the community.
 Kenneth Eric Jury – of Hamilton. For services to the dairy industry. 
 Joan Rosalind Leach – of Raumati Beach. For services to bowls. 
 Commander Gregory Ian Lowe – Royal New Zealand Navy.
 George Lun – of Palmerston North. For services to the community. 
 Colonel Ross Graham Milne  – Colonels' List, New Zealand Army, Territorial Force. 
 Suzanne Elizabeth Moncrieff – of Nelson. For services to the arts and tourism. 
 Margaret Edith Mooney – of Auckland. For services to education. 
 The Reverend Ronald Michael O'Grady – of Auckland. For services to children. 
 Michael Tai Yang Park – of Wellington. For services to business management and Korean–New Zealand relations. 
 Allan Matthew Potts – of Hastings. For services to athletics. 
 Sylvia Mildred Potts – of Hastings. For services to athletics. 
 Professor Sylvia Vine Sheat Rumball – of Palmerston North. For services to science. 
 Rona Winsome Shepherd – of Wellington. For services to horticulture. 
 George Oliver Smart – of Eastbourne, East Sussex, United Kingdom. For services to business management and the community. 
 Roger Neville Walker – of Wellington. For services to architecture. 
 Haki (Jack) Wihongi – of Auckland. For services to the community.

Additional
 Lieutenant Colonel Richard Philip Cassidy – Corps of Royal New Zealand Engineers. For military operational service.

Member (MNZM)
 Marie Appleton  – of Pukekohe. For services to the community. 
 Trevor Percival Blundell  – of Kaikohe. For services to the community. 
 Lieutenant Colonel Geoffrey Thomas Bowes – of Havelock. For services to business management. 
 James Brosnan – of Raglan. For services to local-body and community affairs. 
 Marie Thérèse Nguyen-Ngoe-Dzung Burns – of Auckland. For services to the Vietnamese community. 
 Ronald Thomas Cochrane – of Methven. For services to the community. 
 Graeme Bruce Douglas – of Auckland. For services to the pharmaceutical industry. 
 Catherine Patricia Downes – of Wellington. For services to the arts. 
 Warrant Officer Class Two Michael John Flanagan – Royal New Zealand Army Logistic Regiment. 
 Dorothy Whitson Freed – of Wellington. For services to music. 
 Flight Sergeant Keith Anthony Gell – Royal New Zealand Air Force. 
 Margaret Gluyas – of Ōtorohanga. For services to the community. 
 Sergeant Brad Michael Gray – Royal New Zealand Air Force.
 Dulcie May Gunn – of Dunedin. For services to music. 
 John Stevenson Holloway – of Wellington. For services to forestry and conservation. 
 Peter Vernon Hubscher – of Auckland. For services to the wine industry. 
 Wing Commander Neil Lloyd Hygate – Royal New Zealand Air Force. 
 Colin Ernest George Kitchen – of Whangārei; fire officer, New Zealand Fire Service. For services to the New Zealand Fire Service. 
 Dr Stanley Peter Lay – of Kaponga. For services to medicine and the community. 
 John Allen Lee – of Christchurch. For services to the surf life-saving movement. 
 Edward Roland Lindstrom – of Christchurch. For services to rowing. 
 Donald Ian Matheson – of Wellington. For services to the library profession and Parliament. 
 Graham Gilmer McColl – of Cambridge. For services to the hospitality industry. 
 Lieutenant Commander Peter Mark McKeown – Royal New Zealand Navy. 
 Pamela Jean McLeod – of Taupō. For services to welfare work. 
 Vera Kirihau Morgan  – of Wellington. For services to the community. 
 Turi Joseph Ngatai – of Rotorua. For services to education. 
 Michael Earl Parmenter – of Wellington. For services to the performing arts. 
 Chief Petty Officer Steven James Paul – Royal New Zealand Navy. 
 The Reverend Samuelu Faàpoi Poutasi  – of Auckland. For services to the community. 
 Gerald William Preston – of Auckland. For services to boxing and the community. 
 Maurice Elwin Roberts  – of Hokitika. For services to the community. 
 The Reverend Eileen Lyley Shamy – of Ōtaki. For services to education and the community. 
 Charles Alan Shaw – of Balclutha. For services to education and farming. 
 Prithi Pal Singh – of Auckland. For services to the Indian community. 
 Hohepa Mei Tatere – of Dannevirke. For services to local-body and community affairs. 
 Charmien Mary Torrance – of Auckland. For services to nursing. 
 Nichola Joan Turner – of Auckland. For services to cricket and the community. 
 John Raymond Wignall – of Christchurch. For services to bridge. 
 Douglas Leigh Matthew Worner – of Christchurch. For services to the community. 
 Douglas James Wright – of Auckland. For services to dance.

Additional
 Corporal Daniel Hoani Dewes – Royal New Zealand Army Logistic Regiment. For military operational service.
 Warrant Officer Class One Edward Frederick Estall – Corps of Royal New Zealand Engineers. For military operational service.
 Warrant Officer Class One Tony John Harding – Royal New Zealand Army Logistic Regiment. For military operational service.
 Warrant Officer Radio Electrical Artificer William John McAlpine – Royal New Zealand Navy. For military operational service.
 Lieutenant Commander Gordon Ross Smith – Royal New Zealand Navy. For military operational service.

Companion of the Queen's Service Order (QSO)

For community service
 Atireira Ada Brown – of Bulls. 
 Robin Blundell Lockie  – of Martinborough. 
 Elizabeth Sullivan – of Auckland. 
 Johannes Adriaan Tasman  – of Christchurch. 
 Jill Van Angeren – of Blenheim. 
 Waireti Violet Charlotte Walters  – of Auckland.

For public services
 Leonard Gladestone Ardell – of Nelson. 
 Douglas Warwick Armstrong  – of Orewa. 
 Patrick Norman Baker  – of Drury. 
 Mrs Ngarita Helen Dixon  – of Tuatapere. 
 Dr William Joseph Keith – of Auckland. 
 The Honourable Maurice Patrick McTigue – of Fairfax, Virginia, United States. 
 John Wallace Ridley  – of Auckland. 
 Donald John Riesterer  – of Ōpōtiki. 
 Ngahiwi Kahimia Tangaere  – of Hastings. 
 Dr John Murray Valentine – of Wellington.

Queen's Service Medal (QSM)

For community service
 Kathleen Adam – of Alexandra. 
 Barbara Catherine Bernstein – of Rotorua. 
 Lionel Godfrey Bernstein – of Rotorua. 
 Bessie Maisie Augusta Bishop – of Dannevirke. 
 Francis Eric Bisset – of Kaitangata. 
 John Hearn Bunker – of Christchurch. 
 Mary Alma Cosford – of New Plymouth. 
 Victor Thomas Curtis – of Auckland. 
 Agnes Matilda Dittmer  – of Papakura. 
 Ngarena Rama Griffiths – of Waikanae. 
 Mate-Anini Harawira – of Whakatāne. 
 Walter Anzac Hearn – of Christchurch. 
 Iris Merle Howarth-Hine – of Waihou. 
 Margaret Elizabeth Jamieson – of Nelson. 
 Leatrice Rose Leslie – of Renwick. 
 Peggy Neva Loague  – of Taupō. 
 Edith (Pixie) Rosamund Marsh – of Marton. 
 John Bedford Marsh – of Marton. 
 Esther Valerie Mazey – of Wellington. 
 Edith Shirley McKeever – of Napier. 
 Alice Frances Christine Noble – of Greymouth. 
 Teresa O'Kane (Sister Louise) – of Hokianga. 
 Jean Amanda Laidlaw Orbell – of Hastings. 
 Estelle Barbara Redfern – of Mount Maunganui. 
 Jean Margaret Rickard – of Wellington. 
 Kenneth Darrol James Ruby – of Tauranga. 
 Dulcie Frances Smith – of Waiuku. 
 Jack Stark – of Eltham. 
 Hazel Mary Traynor – of Wellington. 
 Elizabeth Gillian Dawn Westenra – of Blenheim. 
 Maureen Jean Williams – of Auckland. 
 Irene Elizabeth Wilmshurst – of Hamilton.

For public services
 George Bendall Allen  – of Auckland. 
 Catherine Heather Ayrton  – of Kaikohe. 
 Phoebe Mabel Barrett – of Christchurch. 
 Joseph Hicks Bawden – of Orewa. 
 Mary Collins Broderick – of Auckland. 
 Charles Andrew Burnett  – of Rotorua. 
 Brent Sutton Bythell – of Ōtaki. 
 Allan Stuart Drinkrow – of Manukau City. 
 Shirley Ann Groombridge – of Masterton. 
 Edna Rose Harrison – of Pukekohe. 
 Beverley Rae Henneker – of Hamilton. 
 Rae Monteath Hewson – of Ashburton. 
 Hewitt Royden Humphrey  – of Wellington. 
 John William Jameson – of Christchurch. 
 Ian Cecil Knox  – of Kerikeri. 
 Beverly Amelia Lynds – of Waikanae Beach. 
 Francis Edward Burnside Malcolm  – of Manukau City. 
 Mervyn Charles McFarlane – of Patutahi; district officer, Patutahi Volunteer Fire Brigade, New Zealand Fire Service. 
 William Malcolm McKee  – of Riversdale. 
 Jean Heather McKenzie – of Whangārei. 
 Michael Francis Montague – of Auckland. 
 Noel John Oliver – of Takapau; lately chief fire officer, Takapau Volunteer Fire Brigade, New Zealand Fire Service. 
 Richard Wayne Olsen – of Dunedin; lately sergeant, New Zealand Police. 
 Yvonne Shirley Ann Palmer – of Christchurch. 
 John Marshall Reedy – of Tikitiki. 
 Molly Te-Wharerakau Whititera Samuels  – of Katikati. 
 Nicholas Tafao Pa'u Tuitasi – of Auckland; senior constable, New Zealand Police. 
 Dr Gavin Wallace – of Wainuiomata.
 Beryl Theresa Walter (Sister Mary Fidelis) – of Auckland. 
 Richard John Weir – of Wellington. 
 Janet Wilson – of Auckland. 
 Nanette Anne Wright – of Waimate.

References

Birthday Honours
1998 awards
1998 in New Zealand
New Zealand awards